Corben is a surname. A list of people with the name includes:

People
 Gerard Corben, Australian guitarist
 Orland Corben, founder of the Ace Aircraft Manufacturing Company
 Richard Corben (1940–2020), American comic book artist
 Tim Corben Morley, English facilitator

Fictional characters
 John Corben, alias Metallo, cyborg supervillain and foe of Superman
 Michael Corben, the superagent in the film If Looks Could Kill

See also
 Corbin (disambiguation)
 Corbyn (name)

es:Corben
fr:Corben